The Copyright Act 1911, also known as the Imperial Copyright Act of 1911, was an Act of the Parliament of the United Kingdom (UK) which received royal assent on 16 December 1911. The act established copyright law in the UK and the British Empire. The act amended existing UK copyright law, as recommended by a royal commission in 1878 and repealed all previous copyright legislation that had been in force in the UK. The act also implemented changes arising from the first revision of the Berne Convention for the Protection of Literary and Artistic Works in 1908.

The act came into force in the UK on 1 July 1912, in the Channel Islands (except Jersey) on 1 July 1912, in Jersey on 8 March 1913, and in the Isle of Man on 5 July 1912. The Copyright Act 1911 applied or extended to all parts of the British Empire. In India the act came into force on 30 October 1912 (with some modifications in terms of its application to Indian law enacted in 1914), in Burma (then a province of British India) on 24 February 1914, in Papua on 1 February 1931, and all other British possessions on 1 July 1912. It was subsequently enacted on various dates in the self-governing dominions and "territories under protection" of the British Empire. "The Copyright Act 1911 (extension to Palestine), 1924 Ordinance" covered Mandatory Palestine and later the State of Israel, where in the latter it remained the governing statute until the Israeli 2007 Copyright Act took effect on 25 May 2008.

The Act 
In the two centuries after the Statute of Anne of 1710, which afforded copyright protection to books, other works were afforded copyright protection either through case law, as in the case of music, or through Acts of Parliament, as in the case of engravings, paintings, drawings and photographs, in legislation such as the Engraving Copyright Act 1734 and the Fine Arts Copyright Act 1862.

The Copyright Act 1911 consolidated previous copyright statutes, and apart from some minor exceptions, the Copyright Act 1911 repealed all previous copyright legislation and established a single statute covering all forms of copyright.

The 1911 Act implemented the Berne Convention, which abolished the common law copyright in unpublished works and responded to technological developments by conferring copyright on a new type of works not mentioned in the Berne Convention, namely sound recordings.

The 1911 Act abolished the need for registration at the Stationers' Hall and provided that copyright is established upon the creation of a work. However, as the 1911 Act come into effect at different times in different countries of the Commonwealth, registration at Stationers' Hall continued to be required in some Commonwealth countries after 1911. The Act also stated that copyright arose in the act of creation, not the act of publishing.

The scope of copyright was further widened and producers of sound recordings were granted the exclusive right to prevent others reproducing their recordings, or playing them in public. The act provided that the copyright in literary, dramatic and music works could be infringed by the making of a film or other mechanical performance incorporating the copyrighted works.

In Israel, the bulk of amendments were made by the Knesset not to the 1911 Act itself, but to the 1924 Ordinance applying it, resulting in a situation in which the two legal instruments were in conflict - for instance, while the Act set a copyright term of 50 years after the author's death, the Ordinance set a term of 70. Because the Knesset did not amend the Act to respond to further technological developments, the Courts had to apply the Act's definitions, which were centered on artistic works, or types of works not mentioned in it - for instance, phone books, newspapers, restaurant menus and even the codes of Computer Programs were legally deemed "books" for copyright purposes, regardless of their (usually nonexistent) artistic value. These "stretched-boundaries" definitions are maintained in the Copyright Law 5778-2007.

The last country of the former British Empire to repeal the 1911 Act was Myanmar, whose parliament ratified a new, unified copyright law on 24 May 2019, repealing both said Act as well as the Burma Merchandise Marks Act of 1889 and an outdated definition of "trademark" from the Burma Penal Code of 1861.

Summary of changes 
British lawyer Evan James MacGillivray summarised the changes in the introduction of his annotated edition of the 1911 Act as follows:

Imperial copyright act 

With the exception of provisions that were expressly restricted to the United Kingdom by the act, all provisions of the Copyright Act 1911 applied "throughout His Majesty's dominions" and self-governing dominions if enacted by the parliament of that dominion without modifications that were not necessary to adapt the act "to the circumstances of the dominion". The Copyright Act 1911 was adapted to circumstances and enacted by the then self-governing dominions of Australia (Copyright Act 1912), Newfoundland (Newfoundland Copyright Act 1912) and the Union of South Africa (Patents, Designs, Trade Marks and Copyright Act 1916).
The Copyright Act 1911 also provided that the UK Secretary of State could certify copyright laws passed in any self-governing dominion if the copyright legislation was “substantially identical” to those of the Copyright Act 1911. Though the Secretary of State could certify copyright law even if their provisions on copyright enforcement and the restriction on importation of works manufactured in “foreign countries” were not identical to that of the Copyright Act 1911. Such self-governing dominions were then treated as if the Copyright Act 1911 extended to the self-governing dominion. The Secretary of State certified the copyright laws of New Zealand (New Zealand Copyright Act 1913, certified April 1914) and Canada (Copyright Act of Canada 1921, certified 1924).

The Copyright Act 1911 also provided that “His Majesty may, by Order in Council, extend this Act to any territories under his protection and to Cyprus” and the act would then apply to these countries as if they were dominions of the British Empire. In 1912 an Order in Council extended the Copyright Act 1911 to Cyprus and the following territories: Bechuanaland, East Africa, The Gambia, the Gilbert and Ellice Islands, Northern Nigeria, the Northern Territories of the Gold Coast, Nyasaland, Northern Rhodesia, Southern Rhodesia, Sierra Leone, Somaliland, Southern Nigeria, the Solomon Islands, Swaziland, Uganda and Weihaiwei. The Copyright Act 1911 was extended to Palestine by an Order in Council in 1924, it was extended to Tanganyika by an Order in Council in 1924 and 1931, it was extended to the Federated Malay States by an Order in Council in 1931 and 1932, and it was extended to the Cameroons under British Mandate by an Order in Council in 1933.

Influence of the act 
The Copyright Act 1911 provided the template for an approach to copyright exceptions where a specific list of exceptions carefully defines permitted uses of the copyrighted work. The 1911 Act formed the basis of UK copyright law and, as an imperial measure, formed the basis for copyright law in most of what were then British colonies and dominions. While many of these countries have had their own copyright law for a considerable number of years, most have followed the imperial model developed in 1911. Australia, Canada, India, New Zealand, Singapore and South Africa define the limits on and exceptions to copyright by providing an exhaustive list of specifically defined exceptions.

Commonwealth approach to exceptions 
This "Commonwealth approach" to copyright is in contrast with that adopted in US copyright law. US copyright does contain a number of specific exceptions, as well as providing for a fair use defence in section 107 of the Copyright Act 1976. The Section provides a list of illustrative example of uses under this defence, such as criticism, comment and research. In contrast to the Commonwealth fair dealing exceptions, the fair use defence allows US courts to find that a defendant's use is fair and hence not an infringement of copyright, even though the use does not fall within the statutory list provided for in Section 107.

See also
Crown copyright
Copyright Act 1842
Copyright Act 1956
Copyright, Designs and Patents Act 1988
Copyright law of the United Kingdom

References

External links
 Original text, as published
 חוק זכות יוצרים, 1911 – Hebrew text, as in force at repeal in Israel (25 May 2008)

United Kingdom Acts of Parliament 1911
United Kingdom copyright law
Copyright legislation